Biešankovičy (also spelled Beshenkovichy, Beshankovichy) is a town in the Vitebsk Province of Belarus and a port on the Western Dvina river. The population is 6,647 (2017).

History 
In the early 16th century, the small village was part of the Grand Duchy of Lithuania ruled by the Drucki-Sokoliński princes. In 1552 it numbered 34 houses.

In 1630, the village was purchased by the Vilnius Voivode Kazimierz Leon Sapieha. It underwent rapid expansion and was granted Magdeburg rights in 1634. At that time, new stone houses were built and trade fairs were held semiannually, frequented by 4 to 5 thousand visitors from Belarus, Russia and abroad.

After the First Partition of Poland in 1772, control of the village was passed to the Russian Empire. By the end of the 18th century, Biešankovičy was a township of the Lepel Uyezd and later became the center of the volost.

According to an 1897 census, the town's population was 4,423 people, there were 1,099 buildings, a post office, a telegraph, a school, 3 people's schools, 127 shops and a hospital.

At that time, Biešankovičy was a largely Jewish settlement, numbering 3,182 Jewish citizens in 1900. The Jewish Encyclopedia (published between 1901 and 1906), describes the town's population as four fifths Jewish of whom 576 are artisans. The town had a synagogue, many houses of prayer, three benevolent societies, and numerous religious schools.

Under Soviet power, Biešankovičy became an urban settlement and was the center of the raion for several years. It later became part of the Vitebsk oblast.

In 1939, 1,119 Jews lived in the town, making up 26.3% of the total population.
During the second world war, Biešankovičy was occupied by the German Army from 6 July 1941 to 25 June 1944 and was almost entirely destroyed. 10,276 persons from Biešankovičy and the raion were massacred, including the entire Jewish population. A resident at the time of the German occupation recalled, "One Jewish family that had not been taken to the ghetto was still living on my street. When the Jews were being gathered for the shooting, the Germans came to get this family. A little Jewish boy was hiding in the fireplace. The Germans found him and shot him right there, in the house." The town was recaptured on 25 June 1944 by the 1st Baltic Front.

Filip Anadyrov, a key ally of Alexander Lukashenko, spent most of his childhood in Beshankovichy.

References

External links 

 Beshankovichy. Jewish Cemeteries
 Photos at Radzima.org
  The history of the town
  Vitebsk Regional Executive Committee - Information about the Beshenkovichy district
  Belarus Guide - Some historical photographs of Beshenkovichy
  Vitebsk Regional Executive Committee
  The Road to Beshincovichi - Dr. David L. Frey's search for the Jewish cemetery of Beshenkovichy
 The murder of the Jews of Beshankovichy during World War II, at Yad Vashem website.

Urban-type settlements in Belarus
Populated places in Vitebsk Region
Polotsk Voivodeship
Vitebsk Governorate
Shtetls
Holocaust locations in Poland